In mathematics,  the  large Veblen ordinal is a certain large countable ordinal, named after  Oswald Veblen. 

There is no standard notation for ordinals beyond the Feferman–Schütte ordinal Γ0. Most systems of notation use symbols such as ψ(α), θ(α), ψα(β), some of which are modifications of the Veblen functions to produce countable ordinals even for uncountable arguments, and some of which are ordinal collapsing functions.

It was constructed by Veblen using an extension of Veblen functions allowing infinitely many arguments.

References

Ordinal numbers